The 2005 AFL Southern Tasmania (SFL) Premier League premiership season was an Australian rules football competition, staged across Southern Tasmania, Australia over eighteen roster rounds and six finals series matches between 9 April and 10 September 2005.
The competition's major sponsors for the season were Toyota and Hobart radio station Magic 107.3 FM

Participating Clubs
 Brighton Football Club
 Clarence District Football Club
 Glenorchy District Football Club
 Hobart Football Club
 Kingborough Tigers Football Club
 Lauderdale Football Club
 New Norfolk District Football Club
 North Hobart Football Club

2005 AFLST Premier League Club Coaches
 Garry Splann (Brighton)
 Nick Davey (Clarence)
 David Newett (Glenorchy)
 Ian Wilson (Hobart)
 Adrian Goodwin (Kingborough)
 Scott Allen (Lauderdale)
 Matthew Smith (New Norfolk)
 Brendon Bolton (North Hobart)

AFLST Premier League Reserves Grand Final
 Clarence 16.17 (113) d Hobart 6.13 (49)

AFLST Premier League Under-19's Grand Final
 Glenorchy 9.8 (62) d New Norfolk 4.13 (37)

AFLST Premier League Leading Goalkickers
 Sean Salter (New Norfolk) – 69
 Chris Joyce (Kingborough) – 63
 D.Millhouse (Glenorchy) – 50
 Robbie Devine (North Hobart) – 46
 Adrian Burdon (New Norfolk) – 46

Medal Winners
 David Newett (Glenorchy) – William Leitch Medal
 Chris Hess (Kingborough) – George Watt Medal (Reserves)
 Matthew Joyce (Clarence) – V.A Geard Medal (Under-19's)

2005 AFLST Premier League Ladder

Round 1
(Saturday, 9 April 2005)
 New Norfolk 23.15 (153) v Clarence 16.12 (108) – Bellerive Oval
 Nth Hobart 14.16 (100) v Hobart 13.13 (91) – TCA Ground
 Glenorchy 19.13 (127) v Kingborough 13.15 (93) – KGV Football Park
 Lauderdale 21.21 (147) v Brighton 6.6 (42) – Pontville Oval

Round 2
(Saturday, 16 April 2005)
 New Norfolk 13.9 (87) v Kingborough 10.10 (70) – Boyer Oval
 Nth Hobart 30.18 (198) v Brighton 7.4 (46) – North Hobart Oval
 Clarence 21.17 (143) v Glenorchy 9.8 (62) – KGV Football Park
 Lauderdale 15.21 (111) v Hobart 12.13 (85) – Lauderdale Sports Ground

Round 3
(Saturday, 23 April & Sunday, 24 April 2005)
 Clarence 18.7 (115) v Hobart 11.11 (77) – TCA Ground
 New Norfolk 16.8 (104) v Nth Hobart 11.10 (76) – Boyer Oval
 Kingborough 28.19 (187) v Brighton 10.5 (65) – Kingston Beach Oval
 Glenorchy 21.9 (135) v Lauderdale 12.15 (87) – Bellerive Oval (Sunday – Devils Curtain-Raiser)

Round 4
(Saturday, 30 April 2005)
 New Norfolk 9.10 (64) v Glenorchy 8.11 (59) – KGV Football Park
 Nth Hobart 26.19 (175) v Lauderdale 6.7 (43) – North Hobart Oval
 Clarence 22.16 (148) v Kingborough 7.7 (49) – Bellerive Oval
 Hobart 6.11 (47) v Brighton 5.6 (36) – Pontville Oval

Round 5
(Saturday, 7 May 2005)
 Clarence 41.23 (269) v Brighton 5.4 (34) – Bellerive Oval
 Nth Hobart 15.15 (105) v Glenorchy 12.8 (80) – KGV Football Park
 New Norfolk 19.18 (132) v Lauderdale 10.9 (69) – Lauderdale Sports Ground
 Kingborough 21.11 (137) v Hobart 8.10 (58) – Kingston Beach Oval

Round 6
(Saturday, 14 May 2005)
 Nth Hobart 27.13 (175) v Kingborough 11.13 (79) – Kingston Beach Oval
 New Norfolk 29.16 (190) v Brighton 5.3 (33) – Pontville Oval
 Glenorchy 14.8 (92) v Hobart 9.5 (59) – TCA Ground *
 Clarence 28.21 (189) v Lauderdale 10.12 (72) – Lauderdale Sports Ground (Night)
Note: Hobart wore their Black & Gold Tiger heritage strip for this match.

Round 7
(Saturday, 21 May 2005)
 Clarence 23.10 (148) v Nth Hobart 15.4 (94) – North Hobart Oval
 Glenorchy 32.22 (214) v Brighton 6.6 (42) – KGV Football Park
 New Norfolk 15.6 (96) v Hobart 6.4 (40) – Boyer Oval
 Kingborough 20.17 (137) v Lauderdale 15.8 (98) – Lauderdale Sports Ground

Round 8
(Saturday, 28 May 2005)
 New Norfolk 16.13 (109) v Clarence 9.10 (64) – Boyer Oval
 Nth Hobart 19.13 (127) v Hobart 10.9 (69) – North Hobart Oval
 Lauderdale 13.18 (96) v Brighton 11.12 (78) – Lauderdale Sports Ground
 Kingborough 17.10 (112) v Glenorchy 11.8 (74) – Kingston Beach Oval

Round 9
(Saturday, 4 June 2005)
 Clarence 21.7 (133) v Glenorchy 4.9 (33) – Bellerive Oval *
 Nth Hobart 25.15 (165) v Brighton 1.6 (12) – Pontville Oval
 New Norfolk 25.13 (163) v Kingborough 19.15 (129) – Kingston Beach Oval
 Hobart 28.15 (183) v Lauderdale 12.4 (76) – TCA Ground
Note: Clarence wore their Maroon and White heritage strip for this match.

Round 10
(Saturday, 18 June 2005)
 Clarence 18.19 (127) v Hobart 14.6 (90) – Bellerive Oval
 Glenorchy 14.16 (100) v Lauderdale 4.9 (33) – KGV Football Park
 New Norfolk 14.20 (104) v Nth Hobart 13.7 (85) – North Hobart Oval
 Kingborough 19.12 (126) v Brighton 8.7 (55) – Pontville Oval

Round 11
(Saturday, 25 June 2005)
 Clarence 21.15 (141) v Kingborough 22.6 (138) – Kingston Beach Oval
 Nth Hobart 22.19 (151) v Lauderdale 6.5 (41) – Lauderdale Sports Ground
 New Norfolk 14.10 (94) v Glenorchy 9.10 (64) – Boyer Oval
 Hobart 22.20 (152) v Brighton 5.4 (34) – TCA Ground

Round 12
(Saturday, 2 July 2005)
 New Norfolk 32.18 (210) v Brighton 4.1 (25) – Boyer Oval
 Clarence 27.16 (178) v Lauderdale 4.12 (36) – Bellerive Oval
 Nth Hobart 17.20 (122) v Kingborough 13.4 (82) – North Hobart Oval
 Glenorchy 12.13 (85) v Hobart 7.12 (54) – KGV Football Park

Round 13
(Saturday, 9 July 2005)
 New Norfolk 18.6 (114) v Lauderdale 12.14 (86) – Boyer Oval
 Clarence 33.14 (212) v Brighton 4.4 (28) – Pontville Oval
 Nth Hobart 12.11 (83) v Glenorchy 9.11 (65) – North Hobart Oval
 Kingborough 17.7 (109) v Hobart 10.3 (63) – TCA Ground

Round 14
(Saturday, 16 July 2005)
 New Norfolk 14.18 (102) v Hobart 12.10 (82) – TCA Ground
 Nth Hobart 14.14 (98) v Clarence 13.7 (85) – Bellerive Oval
 Glenorchy 17.12 (114) v Brighton 8.7 (55) – Pontville Oval
 Kingborough 16.21 (117) v Lauderdale 11.5 (71) – Kingston Beach Oval

Round 15
(Saturday, 23 July 2005)
 New Norfolk 26.14 (170) v Kingborough 9.3 (57) – Boyer Oval
 Glenorchy 16.14 (110) v Clarence 11.14 (80) – KGV Football Park
 Nth Hobart 28.25 (193) v Brighton 8.5 (53) – North Hobart Oval
 Lauderdale 16.8 (104) v Hobart 11.8 (74) – Lauderdale Sports Ground

Round 16
(Saturday, 30 July 2005)
 New Norfolk 29.16 (190) v Nth Hobart 7.8 (50) – Boyer Oval
 Glenorchy 23.12 (150) v Lauderdale 11.14 (80) – Lauderdale Sports Ground
 Clarence 20.18 (138) v Hobart 6.14 (50) – TCA Ground
 Kingborough 21.19 (145) v Brighton 10.13 (73) – Kingston Beach Oval

Round 17
(Saturday, 6 August 2005)
 New Norfolk 15.15 (105) v Clarence 10.11 (71) – Bellerive Oval
 Glenorchy 23.17 (155) v Kingborough 15.5 (95) – KGV Football Park
 Nth Hobart 15.12 (102) v Hobart 12.13 (85) – TCA Ground
 Lauderdale 14.12 (96) v Brighton 13.9 (87) – Pontville Oval

Round 18
(Saturday, 13 August 2005)
 Glenorchy 12.12 (84) v New Norfolk 10.18 (78) – KGV Football Park
 Nth Hobart 24.21 (165) v Lauderdale 8.8 (56) – North Hobart Oval
 Clarence 23.17 (155) v Kingborough 12.3 (75) – Bellerive Oval
 Hobart 20.14 (134) v Brighton 10.5 (65) – Pontville Oval

Elimination Final
(Saturday, 20 August 2005)
 Glenorchy 16.6 (102)
 Kingborough 1.9 (15)
Attendance: Not Available at KGV Football Park

Qualifying Final
(Saturday, 20 August 2005)
 Clarence 13.15 (93)
 Nth Hobart 10.8 (68)
Attendance: Not Available at North Hobart Oval

First Semi Final
(Saturday, 27 August 2005)
 Nth Hobart 16.9 (105)
 Glenorchy 13.7 (85)
Attendance: Not Available at North Hobart Oval

Second Semi Final
(Saturday, 27 August 2005)
 New Norfolk 18.15 (123)
 Clarence 12.9 (81)
Attendance: Not Available at Boyer Oval

Preliminary final
(Saturday, 3 September 2005)
 Clarence 20.18 (138)
 Nth Hobart 8.13 (61)
Attendance: Not Available at Bellerive Oval

Grand final
(Saturday, 10 September 2005)
 New Norfolk 19.16 (130)
 Clarence 14.8 (92)
Attendance: 5,114 at North Hobart Oval

References
 2005 AFL Southern Tasmania Premier League Grand Final matchday program (Pages 10, 11, 12, 14, 25, 27, 38 and 39)

External links
 Official SFL Website

2005
2005 in Australian rules football